Etzaz Muzafar Hussain (born 27 January 1993) is a professional footballer who plays as a midfielder for Cypriot club Apollon Limassol. Born in Oslo, he played for nearby Langhus as a youth player, before moving to Manchester United in 2009. After two years in England, he returned to Norway with Vålerenga, but shortly after moved to Fredrikstad, where he made his professional debut. Hussain transferred to Molde in mid-2012 and won the Tippeligaen in his first season at the club. After winning four league titles and three Norwegian Cups with Molde across two spells, he moved to Apollon Limassol as a free agent in January 2023.

Playing career
Hussain is of Pakistani descent, but was born in Oslo, and played for Langhus in his early days, before he transferred to Manchester United on 21 February 2009, and signed a professional contract with United on his 17th birthday. Even though Hussain only stayed in England for two years, and did not get any chances for the first team, he said to the Norwegian newspaper VG in February 2012 that "it was an experience for life" and would advice other Norwegian youngster to grab the opportunity if they had the chance. In January 2011 he returned home to Norway, and signed for the Tippeligaen club Vålerenga.

Less than three months later, Hussain signed for Fredrikstad, also a Tippeligaen club, after some disagreements between Vålerenga and Hussain on the way forward. On 14 August 2011, Hussain sent Fredrikstad to the semi-final of 2011 Norwegian Football Cup with the match-winning goal with only a couple of minutes left of the overtime, at the expense of Molde now managed by his former boss at the Manchester United reserves, Ole Gunnar Solskjær. On 31 October 2011, Hussain scored his second goal in two matches, with the match winning goal against Vålerenga, the club that believed he was not good enough for Tippeligaen.

Molde
On 27 July 2012, Hussain moved to Molde FK, reuniting with Ole Gunnar Solskjær. He won the league with Molde in 2012 and 2014 and the Norwegian Cup in 2013 and 2014.

Sivasspor
On 7 January 2016, Hussain signed a 2.5-year contract with Turkish Süper Lig side Sivasspor. With Sivasspor, Hussein was unable to avoid relegation to the second Turkish division. Following relegation, his contract at Sivasspor was terminated in mutual agreement on 4 July 2016.

Rudeš Zagreb
Hussain signed for the second-tier Croatian side NK Rudeš, coached by the former Liverpool player Igor Bišćan, in October 2016.

Molde return

On 28 February 2017, Molde announced that Hussain had returned to the club. On 11 July 2019, he scored Molde's sixth goal in the club's UEFA competitions record 7–1 win over KR in the UEFA Europa League first qualifying round. On 20 October 2019, he scored a brace in an Eliteserien game Molde won 3–1 over Haugesund. On 31 January 2020, Hussain signed a new contract with Molde that will keep him at the club till the end of the 2022 season.

Apollon Limassol
Following Hussain's release from Molde after winning the 2022 Eliteserien, Cypriot club Apollon Limassol announced on 20 January 2023 that the midfielder had reached an agreement to sign with the defending Cypriot league champions till May 2025. On 24 January 2023, Etzaz Hussain formally signed with the Limassol club and chose to play with the number 18. He made his league debut for the club on 9 February, coming on as a late substitute in the 4-3 home defeat to Karmiotissa.

International career 
Hussain played on youth level for Norway. As he has never appeared for Norway in a competitive match, he remains potentially eligible to represent Pakistan. In October 2021, he had declared his intention to play for Pakistan.

Career statistics

Honours
Molde
 Eliteserien: 2012, 2014, 2019, 2022
 Norwegian Cup: 2013, 2014, 2021–22

References

1993 births
Living people
People from Ski, Norway
Norwegian people of Pakistani descent
Norwegian footballers
Pakistani footballers
Eliteserien players
Süper Lig players
First Football League (Croatia) players
Cypriot First Division players
Association football midfielders
Manchester United F.C. players
Vålerenga Fotball players
Fredrikstad FK players
Molde FK players
Sivasspor footballers
NK Rudeš players
Odds BK players
Apollon Limassol FC players
Expatriate footballers in Cyprus
Norwegian expatriate sportspeople in Cyprus
Expatriate footballers in England
Expatriate footballers in Turkey
Expatriate footballers in Croatia
Norwegian expatriate footballers
Norwegian expatriate sportspeople in England
Norwegian expatriate sportspeople in Turkey
Pakistani expatriates in England
Norway youth international footballers
Norway under-21 international footballers
Sportspeople from Viken (county)